Cruoria is a genus of crustose red alga – that is, a seaweed.

It resembles the genera Ralfsia, Lithoderma  and Hildenbrandtia.

References

External links
 http://www.algaebase.org/search/species/detail/?species_id=117 : Algaebase. Contains images.

Red algae genera
Cruoriaceae